Hatem Zeine is an American physicist, inventor, and technologist from Jordan known for his invention of RF-based wireless power transmission, called Cota®.

Biography 
Hatem Zeine holds a BSc in Physics from the University of Manchester, UK, and is a speaker on wireless power and its potential.

Work 
Hatem Zeine founded Ossia in 2008 and launched the company in 2013 at TechCrunch Disrupt, where he first demonstrated his wireless power technology that uses thousands of tiny antennas to send beacon signals between a transmitter and receiver.

Prior to founding Ossia, Mr. Zeine was a Director/Principal Engineer at Microsoft, where he filed seven patents. He also founded Zeine Technological Applications, known later as Estarta Solutions. He also served as co-founder and vice chairman of the Information Technology Association of Jordan before he relocated to the U.S. in 2005.

References 

Living people
Year of birth missing (living people)
21st-century American physicists
21st-century American inventors
Alumni of the University of Manchester
Jordanian scientists